SV Stegersbach is an Austrian association football club playing in the 5th tier Burgenland II Liga South for the season 2020/2021.

Current squad

Staff

 Trainer:  Joachim Poandl
 Co-Trainer:  Siderits Helmut
 Goalkeeper coach:  Kreitzer Josef
 Physio:  Attlila Fider

External links
  http://www.sv-stegersbach.at/  Official Website

Association football clubs established in 1929
Football clubs in Austria
1929 establishments in Austria